The Florida-Georgia District is one of the 35 districts of the Lutheran Church–Missouri Synod (LCMS), and encompasses the states of Georgia and Florida, with the exception of the Florida Panhandle which is part of the Southern District; in addition, four Florida congregations and two Georgia congregations are in the non-geographic English District, and four more Florida congregations are in the non-geographic SELC District. The Florida-Georgia District includes approximately 203 congregations and missions, subdivided into 22 circuits, as well as 45 preschools, 35 elementary schools and 2 high schools. Baptized membership in district congregations is approximately 53,800.

The Florida-Georgia District was formed in 1948 out of the Southern District, with a number of Georgia congregations also moving from the Southeastern District. District offices are located in Orlando, Florida. Delegates from each congregation meet in convention every three years to elect the district president, vice presidents, circuit counselors, a board of directors, and other officers. The Rev. James H. Rockey was elected District President in 2022.

Presidents
Rev. Conrad F. Kellermann, 1948–57
Rev. Frederick W. Lorberg, 1957–63
Rev. August Bernthal, 1963–74
Rev. L. Lloyd Behnken, 1974–87 (died in office)
Rev. Thomas R. Zehnder, 1987–97
Rev. Edgar Trinklein, 1997
Rev. Gerhard C. Michael, Jr., 1997–2009
Rev. Greg Walton, 2009–2022
Rev. James H. Rockey, 2022–current

References

External links
Florida-Georgia District web site
LCMS: Florida-Georgia District
LCMS Congregation Directory

Lutheran Church–Missouri Synod districts
Protestantism in Florida
Protestantism in Georgia (U.S. state)
Christian organizations established in 1948
Religion in the Southern United States
1948 establishments in the United States
Lutheranism in Georgia (U.S. state)